XHVIR-FM is a radio station in Ciudad Victoria, Tamaulipas, broadcasting on 101.7 FM. It airs a grupera format known as La Cotorra.

History
Francisco Eugenio Filizola González obtained the concession for XHVIR on August 26, 1994. ORT acquired the station in 2000.

References

Regional Mexican radio stations
Radio stations in Ciudad Victoria